VR Baseball 2000 is a video game developed by American studio VR Sports and published by Interplay for Windows in 1998.

Reception

The game received average reviews according to the review aggregation website GameRankings. Next Generation said, "Considering the fact that Interplay was working with an untested engine this year, VR Baseball 2000 is pretty promising, but in many ways it's still not quite there yet."

References

External links
 

1998 video games
Baseball video games
Interplay Entertainment games
North America-exclusive video games
Video games developed in the United States
Windows games
Windows-only games